The Emhoff House is a historic house in Stevensville, Montana. It was built in 1902 for John C. Emhoff, the owner of the  Stevensville Stage and Transport Company. Emhoff lived here with his wife and their twin daughters. He was a Freemason, and he died in 1930. One of his daughters, Elizabeth, inherited the house and lived here with her husband, Lawrence Saltz. The house was subsequently purchased by the Golder family. It has been listed on the National Register of Historic Places since June 19, 1991.

References

Houses completed in 1902
Houses on the National Register of Historic Places in Montana
National Register of Historic Places in Ravalli County, Montana
1902 establishments in Montana